In Greek mythology, Anchiroe or Ankhiroê (Ancient Greek: Αγχιροη means 'pouring flow') was the consort of Sithon, son of Ares, and the mother of two daughters, Pallenaea and Rhoetea, from whom two towns derived their names. In some accounts, Achiroe was the mother of Sithon, Pallene and Rhoeteia by Ares instead.

Notes

References 

 Bell, Robert E., Women of Classical Mythology: A Biographical Dictionary. ABC-Clio. 1991. .
Stephanus of Byzantium, Stephani Byzantii Ethnicorum quae supersunt, edited by August Meineike (1790-1870), published 1849. A few entries from this important ancient handbook of place names have been translated by Brady Kiesling. Online version at the Topos Text Project.

Mythological Thracian women
Characters in Greek mythology
Greek mythology of Thrace